Dowiyogo is a surname. Notable people with the surname include:

 Bernard Dowiyogo (1946–2003), 2nd president of Nauru
 Christine Dowiyogo (1948–2008), First Lady of Nauru
 Valdon Dowiyogo (1968–2016), Nauruan politician

Surnames of Oceanian origin